Wave is a genre of electronic bass music and a visual art style that emerged in the early 2010s in online communities. It is characterized by atmospheric melodies and harmonies, melodic and heavy bass such as reese, modern trap drums, chopped vocal samples processed with reverb and delay, and arpeggiators. Visually, it incorporates computer-generated imagery and animation, and imagery from video games and cartoons.

Wave music originated on online music platforms from a small group of DIY artists. Since then, wave music uploaded to streaming platforms such as YouTube has gathered millions of plays, which is partially attributable to the genre's broad influences. Since 2016, the wave scene has experienced an increase in physical events. From 2017 onward, the genre further incorporated elements of trance and hardstyle, leading to the emergence of the hardwave subgenre.

Characteristics

Musical qualities and influences 
Wave attempts to convey emotions such as melancholy, and qualities such as dreaminess, femininity, and otherworldliness. In this context it is comparable with genres such as witch house and emo rap. Wave emphasizes melodic and harmonic aspects using tools like arpeggiation and atmospheric pads. It also draws from styles such as trap and grime for interludes and drum beats. The genre utilities science fiction themes style akin to grime, Wave has experimentalism relative to the Los Angeles beat scene, and incorporates elements from many other genres such as hip-hop, dubstep, UK garage, drill, vaporwave, cloud rap, video game music and sound design, ambient, house, techno, and jungle.

Production style 
A genre of bass music, wave is typically bass heavy, and generally utilizes a filtered Reese style bass timbre. The percussion features trap-style drums with fast hi-hats, with other elements like snare and pan-hits further processed using reverb. The percussive styles used can vary owing to the music's broad range of influences and various producer's willingness to experiment. The beats per minute typically varies between 120 and 140, but wave DJ sets can range from 100 to 200. Vocals used are generally chopped samples, for which reverb and delay effects are applied to decrease and increase the pitch.

Visual aesthetics 
Wave's visual aesthetics incorporates digital art such as computer-generated imagery and animation. In the scene's origins, these art were combined with wave music on Tumblr, and later become used as visuals for physical events. Wave can also display imagery taken from video games and cartoons.

History 

The development and spread of wave music as an independent genre began in the early 2010s on online music platforms and social media (mainly SoundCloud, Bandcamp, Mixcloud, Reddit, and Tumblr), among a small DIY community of artists—often teenagers who were not associated with club culture and the mainstream—who were making electronic music with different sonic influences but, according to producer Glacci, similar subjective qualities of "feeling". Plastician has said that many of those early producers were either trying to achieve rap instrumentation akin to Clams Casino, or had grime influences but applied different tempos. As new artists attempted to reproduce the sound of these early tracks, wave producers began to be influenced mainly by each other, which allowed wave to develop distinguishable musical characteristics.

Wave's direct origins can be dated to at least 2013 when UK-based producer Steven "Klimeks" Adams began tagging his tracks on SoundCloud as 'wave', and subsequently founded the prominent label Wavemob. In 2015, the label published its first release, the compilation album wave 001 with tracks by producers such as Klimeks, Skit, Spoze, and Nvrmore, and followed this with wave 002 in July 2016. Other Wavemob producers included Øfdream, and Trash Lord who was originally from the witch house scene.

In 2013, Plastician became an early embracer of the wave scene, led by his interest in music with trap elements from the LA beat scene, but less influenced by festival music which brought him to Klimeks' works. In that year, Plastician started promoting the genre by featuring wave music on his then decade-active radio shows on Rinse FM, and by releases on his label Terrorhythm Recordings, for instance Klimeks's remix of "Born in the Cold" on the compilation album Turquoise. In December 2015, Plastician released The Wave Pool MMXV mix featuring a selection of wave music "on the dubbed out end of trap" with "shattered hip hop beats, jagged basslines", and atmosphere. This mix popularized the term wave within the music press and further promoted its general usage.

In early 2016, wave producer Jude "Kareful" Leigh-Kaufman became the first artist to release a full-length wave album, Deluge. In 2017, Kareful, LTHL, and Oskar "Stohou" Barczak founded the Liquid Ritual label and collective—named after Kareful's show on Radar Radio—for promoting wave music made by producers such as Deadcrow, Noah B, LAIRE, Vacant, Hefu, Stohou, and Dyzphoria.

Since 2016, the wave scene—originally an online phenomenon—has experienced an increase in physical events. In that year, the main location for wave events was London, primarily Dalston. In 2016, Plastician ran a club night at Phonox, in Brixton, named Survey London, which featured wave producers such as Kareful, Skit, and Glacci. Other entities that supported the London wave scene were Mixmag featuring wave artists such as Skit at Ace Hotel, and Kareful who hosted events in that city. There are other local scenes in Europe, the United States, Canada, Australia, Russia, and Poland.

In 2017, Perth-based producers Skeler and Ytho began incorporating elements from trance and hardstyle into wave for appealing to the broader festival and club audiences and thus popularize the genre. This lead the wave scene to evolve into the emergent subgenre known as hardwave.

In 2018, Japanese musician DEAN FUJIOKA released the single "Echo", which was "inspired by wave music". It became the theme song for the Japanese TV series The Count of Monte-Cristo: Great Revenge, in which he starred. The music video for the song also won the Best Alternative Video at the MTV Video Music Awards Japan. In 2021, he released the song "Plan B" as the "latest evolution of wave".

In December 2022, vibe.digital, Human Error// and Soul Food Music Collective collaborated on the largest North American Wave gathering 'Pantheon'- a three day festival in Seattle, WA. featuring artists within the wave scene.

Genre name origin 
Use of the word wave to categorize a style of music is attributed to UK-based music producer Steven "Klimeks" Adams. In circa 2013 he used the term as a keyword on SoundCloud. It was adopted and popularized by Plastician while promoting the genre in his radio shows on Rinse FM, Wave Pool mixes, at club events, and through his label Terrorhythm Recordings.

Reception 
In May 2017, Vice published an article by Ezra Marcus who wrote that the wave community and bloggers were categorizing a wide range of music within a "constructed microgenre", without a distinctive or innovative sound, in order to strategically exploit algorithms on streaming platforms such as YouTube. Plastician responded to Marcus's article, arguing that most wave producers were generally younger people who lack marketing skills and are unfamiliar with YouTube algorithms.

References

Further reading

External links 
 WavePool on Reddit

2010s in music
2020s in music
Electronic music genres
Experimental music genres